Miloš ("Mićo") Milošević (born 10 May 1972) is a swimmer from Croatia. His best swimming discipline was butterfly stroke, but he also competed in freestyle and backstroke.

Miloš Milošević was born in Split to an ethnic Serb family. He enrolled in the swimming school of the swimming club "Mornar" in 1980, which lasted four years. At the age of 14, he started competing in youth swimming competitions of SFR Yugoslavia. He won a total of eight gold medals as a junior.

He later moved to Rijeka, to the swimming club "Primorje". As a person  of Serb descent, during the Croatian War of Independence he had considerable difficulty trying to compete for Croatia. He missed the 1992 Summer Olympics in Barcelona, but his talent eventually secured him a place in the national swimming team. He competed in the 1996 Summer Olympics and the 2000 Summer Olympics.

Milošević won his first major award at the 1992 European Championship when he took the bronze in the 50 meter butterfly event. At the 1993 World Championship he proceeded to take the gold in the 100 meters butterfly race. The same year he won the bronze at the 1993 European Championship. In the 1994 World Championships he was fifth in that event.

His best result happened at the 1998 European Championship where he won the gold medal in the 50 meters butterfly, as well as broke the world record, with the time 23.30 seconds. At the European Short Course Swimming Championships 1999 he also won the gold medal in the same event, and silver at the European LC Championships 1999.

At the European Short Course Swimming Championships 2002 he won the silver medal in 50 meter butterfly. He retired from professional swimming in 2004. His personal best in the 50 meter butterfly event was 23.30 (1998), and in the 100 meter butterfly event 52.24 (1998).

He currently trains the youth at his swimming club "Primorje" in Rijeka.

References

External links
 
 
 
 

1972 births
Living people
Sportspeople from Split, Croatia
Croatian male swimmers
Serbs of Croatia
Yugoslav male swimmers
Male butterfly swimmers
Croatian swimming coaches
Swimmers at the 1996 Summer Olympics
Swimmers at the 2000 Summer Olympics
Olympic swimmers of Croatia
World record setters in swimming
Medalists at the FINA World Swimming Championships (25 m)
European Aquatics Championships medalists in swimming
Mediterranean Games gold medalists for Croatia
Mediterranean Games silver medalists for Croatia
Swimmers at the 1993 Mediterranean Games
Swimmers at the 2001 Mediterranean Games
Mediterranean Games medalists in swimming